Shri Amrit Nath Ashram is an ashram of the Nath Sampradaya of MannaNathi Panth founded by Shri Amritnathji Maharaj in a  small town of Fatehpur in region of Shekhawati which comes in Sikar district of Rajasthan, India. 
The region of Shekhawati is renowned for its artwork and beautiful havelis. The area is also very rich in wildlife, particularly birds, with different varieties of parrots, peacocks, white eagles, nilkanths and other exotic species.

Ashram
Sri Amrit Nath Ashram is a sacred space and a spectacular place for chanting and meditative saints. The saints and devotees who come there have realizations of spiritual, emotional and mental peace. The calm atmosphere and ambience of the Ashram feels like heaven to the people who go there. Spearheading the Guru Gorakhnath clan, this Ashram belonging to the Mannaathi sect or panth has given countless knowledgeable saints to society. These saints have not only governed this Ashram belonging to the Mannaathi sect or panth but at points in time, have governed all Ashrams even outside of the Mannaathi sect or panth through which constant social welfare work has been done.

According to the scriptures and mythology, Lord Shiva had manifested as Guru Gorakhnath to make Yoga popular. And by becoming a teacher of yoga and through his knowledge of nutrition and diet, Guru Gorakhnath worked for the welfare of humanity and it is believed that the founder of this ashram Sri AmritNathji Maharaj is one of the form Guru Gorakhnath of by the people, this is what his devotees and followers believe. Sri Amrit Nathji Maharaj lived in the forest for 24 years as he developed the science of yoga and naturopathy by experimenting on his own body.

Alongside is the Dhuna of Shri AmritNathji. This is the place where Shri AmritNathji remained absorbed with penances. The fire burns constantly in the Dhuna. In front of the Samadhi is the newly built huge hall with beautiful pictures depicting life of Baba Shri AmritNathji - Shri Amrit Lila. The beautiful mirror work on the ceiling attracts one's attention endlessly. Morning and evening "Aartis" are held in this hall and people use this place for meditation. The atmosphere here is serene, having a calming effect on the mind.
The Ashram is spread over a very vast area & is surrounded by greeneries & beautiful nature. It looks like a heaven in desert.

Samadhi 
The four Samadhi of the divine Gurus that have been the Mahant Shri shri Amrit Nathji maharaj, Shri Jyoti Nathji, Shri Subh Nathji and Shri Hanuman Nathji in shining white marble enhances with beautiful work done on that matching the beauty of the place.
Alongside is the dhuni of Shri Amrit Nathji. This is the place where Shri Amrit Nathji remained absorbed with penances.  The fire burns constantly in the samadhi which is also known as Akhand Jyoti.
In front of the samadhi is the newly built huge hall with beautiful pictures depicting life of Baba Shri Amrit Nathji - Shri Amrit Lila.  The beautiful mirror work on the ceiling attracts one's attention endlessly.  Morning and evening aarttis the traditional worship are held in this hall. People use this place for meditation.

Agriculture
It has a vast agricultural land and most of the food grain and vegetables are grown for the consumption of its inhabitants and visitors.  The ashram tries to be self-sufficient.  The food grains like wheat, millet (bajra), gram (chana) and vegetables are grown here organically.

The ashram has its own cows.  The yogurt prepared from this milk along with bread prepared from bajra is the favorites breakfast for most of the visitors. It is about 320 km from Delhi and 150 km from Jaipur by road . The ashram today has more than 100 rooms with all modern amenities.

References 
 Shri Amrit Nath Ashram website. Retrieved Mar. 7, 2006.

Ashrams